The Tacoma class of patrol frigates served in the United States Navy during World War II and the Korean War. Originally classified as gunboats (PG), they were reclassified as patrol frigates (PF) on 15 April 1943. The class is named for its lead ship, a Maritime Commission (MARCOM) S2-S2-AQ1 design, which in turn was named for the city of Tacoma, Washington. Twenty-one ships were transferred to the British Royal Navy, in which they were known as Colony-class frigates, and twenty-eight ships were transferred under Lend-Lease to the Soviet Navy, where they were designated as storozhevoi korabl ("escort ships"), during World War II. All Tacoma-class ships in US service during World War II were manned by United States Coast Guard crews. Tacoma-class ships were transferred to the United States Coast Guard and various navies post-World War II.

Design
In 1942, the success of German submarines against Allied shipping and the shortage of escorts with which to protect Allied sea lines of communication convinced US President Franklin D. Roosevelt of a need to engage mercantile shipbuilders in the construction of warships for escort duty. The United States Maritime Commission (MARCOM), which oversaw the wartime merchant shipbuilding program, proposed to meet this requirement by building a version of the British River-class frigate, a Royal Navy ship type based on a mercantile design in British shipyards experienced in building commercial ships.

The naval architecture firm of Gibbs & Cox, designed the Tacoma class by modifying the River class to American requirements. The Tacoma-class units were designed and armed to serve mostly as anti-submarine warfare (ASW) ships. They were distinguished from the River class primarily by their pole (instead of the British tripod) foremast and lighter main guns, /50 caliber gun instead of the British /40 caliber gun, and they had an American rather than British powerplant.

The Tacoma-class was designed to take advantage of American construction techniques employing prefabrication. Unlike most other types of warship, the Tacomas, like the Rivers, were built to mercantile standards. With the proven effectiveness of the River class on escort duty, MARCOM's goal was to allow commercial shipyards without prior experience of naval construction standards to build effective warships more cheaply and efficiently. MARCOM had hoped that the US Navy, some members of which doubted that the commercial shipyards could build a sturdy enough warship, would accept them because of the proven service record of the River-class ships which inspired their design.

The resulting ships had a greater range than the superficially similar destroyer escorts, but the US Navy viewed them as decidedly inferior in all other respects. The Tacoma class had a much larger turning circle than a destroyer escort, lacked sufficient ventilation for warm-weather operations – a reflection of their original British design and its emphasis on operations in the North Atlantic Ocean – and were criticized as far too hot below decks, and, because of the mercantile style of their hulls, had far less resistance to underwater explosions than ships built to naval standards like the destroyer escorts.

Like their predecessors Asheville and Natchez, the Tacoma-class ships built for the US Navy all were named after small cities in the United States.

Construction program
In November 1942, MARCOM gave its West Coast Regional Office the responsibility for coordinating the construction of the ships of the Tacoma class, which were to be split between commercial shipyards on the United States West Coast and five shipyards on the Great Lakes, the latter in particular chosen because they had building ways available for use in the Tacoma program. MARCOM tendered a contract to Kaiser Cargo, Inc., of Oakland, California, to prepare detailed specifications based on the Gibbs & Cox design and to manage the overall construction program.

On 8 December 1942, MARCOM contracted for 69 Tacoma-class ships, for which the US Navy dropped the British "corvette" designation in favor of classifying the Tacomas (along with the two Asheville-class ships that preceded them) as "patrol gunboats" (PG); on 15 April 1943, the two Ashevilles and all Tacomas were reclassified as "patrol frigates" (PF). Kaiser Cargo itself received an order for 12 ships; the Consolidated Steel Corporation, of Wilmington, California, received an order for 18; the American Ship Building Company, received an order for 11, with four to be built at Cleveland, Ohio, and eight at Lorain, Ohio; the Walter Butler Shipbuilding Company, of Superior, Wisconsin, received an order for 12; Froemming Brothers, Inc., of Milwaukee, received an order for four; the Globe Shipbuilding Company, of Superior, Wisconsin, received an order for eight; and the Leathem D. Smith Shipbuilding Company, of Sturgeon Bay, Wisconsin, received an order for eight. American Shipbuilding later received an order for another six (four at Cleveland and two at Lorain), bringing the total orders for the US Navy to 79 ships, while the Walsh-Kaiser Company, of Providence, Rhode Island, received an order for 21 additional ships, all of which were to be transferred to the Royal Navy, where they were known as the Colony class, bringing the total planned construction to 100 units.

From the beginning, the construction program was plagued by difficulties which caused it to fall far behind schedule. Unfamiliar with the capabilities of the Great Lakes yards, Kaiser Cargo used prefabrication techniques unsuited to the Great Lakes yards smaller cranes and had to rework them. Ice prevented patrol frigates built on the Great Lakes from transiting the Soo Locks on the St. Marys River between Lake Superior and Lake Michigan, in the winter and spring, requiring them to be floated down the Mississippi River on pontoons to New Orleans or Houston for fitting out, often doubling their construction time. Delays became so lengthy that shipyards began to deliver the ships in such an incomplete state that shakedown and post-shakedown periods of repair and alteration took months for some of them. Bilge keels that cracked in rough seas or cold weather, failures in the welds holding the deckhouse to the deck, engine trouble, and ventilation problems plagued all of the ships. As a result, no Tacoma-class ship was commissioned until late in 1943, none were ready for service until 1944, and the last one, was not commissioned until March 1945. The ships Consolidated Steel built proved the most reliable, while Kaiser Cargo-built units were the most trouble-prone; among the latter, Tacoma took ten months of shakedown and repairs to be ready after her commissioning, and  proved equally difficult to make ready for service.

Service
By the time the first Tacoma-class ships were ready for front-line service in 1944, the US Navys requirement for them had passed, thanks to a decline in the threat from Axis submarines, and the availability of ample numbers of destroyers and destroyer escorts, which the Navy regarded as much superior to the Tacoma class. The Navy crewed all of the Tacoma-class ships with United States Coast Guard personnel. The Consolidated Steel-built ships, thanks to their superior reliability and performance, all saw service in the Pacific war zone where one, teamed with the minesweeper  to sink the Japanese submarine I-12 in November 1944, but the US Navy generally relegated the patrol frigates to local training and escort responsibilities, and to duty as weather ships, for which the aft mounted 3-inch gun was removed in order to allow the installation of a weather balloon hangar.

The United States built an additional 21 Tacoma-class ships for the United Kingdom for service in the Royal Navy, where they were known as the Colony class, and all but one of them initially received British names, rather than the names of small US cities, while still US Navy ships; they were returned to the United States between 1946 and 1948. Eighteen of these were quickly scrapped, but two were sold to Egypt, for use as civilian passenger ships, and one to Argentina, for service as a warship in the Argentine Navy.

As a part of Project Hula, a secret 1945 program that transferred 149 US Navy ships to the Soviet Navy at Cold Bay, Alaska, in anticipation of the Soviet Union joining the war against Japan, the US Navy transferred 28 Tacoma-class ships to the Soviet Navy between July and September 1945. They were the largest, most heavily armed, and most expensive ships transferred during the program. At least some of them saw action in the Soviet offensive against Japanese forces in Northeast Asia, in August 1945. One of the transferred ships, EK-3 (ex-), ran aground and was damaged beyond economical repair in a November 1948 storm off Petropavlovsk-Kamchatsky, but the Soviet Union returned the other 27 frigates to the United States in October and November 1949.

The US Navy quickly decommissioned 23 Tacoma-class ships after the end of World War II, after only very brief US Navy careers, and sold them for scrap in 1947 and 1948, although one, the former , was saved from the scrapyard to become a Brazilian merchant ship. The 27 ships the Soviet Union returned in 1949 went into the US Navys Pacific Reserve Fleet in Japan; 13 of them were recommissioned for US Navy service in the Korean War, but all 27 soon were transferred to the navies of other countries. The other 25 Tacoma-class ships never returned to service in the US Navy and also were transferred to foreign countries. In the post-World War II era, Tacoma-class patrol frigates operated in the Japan Maritime Self-Defense Force, the Republic of Korea Navy, and the Argentine, Belgian, Colombian, Cuban, Dominican, Ecuadorian, French, Mexican, Royal Netherlands, Peruvian, and Royal Thai navies, and one ship operated as a civilian weather ship for the government of the Netherlands. In foreign navies, many Tacoma-class ships survived into the 1960s and 1970s, and the last operator of Tacoma-class patrol frigates, Thailand, did not retire its two ships until 2000.

List of ships
The Tacoma-class ships, listed in order of US Navy hull number, and their dates of active service and fates follow.

Gallery

Tacoma-class patrol frigates, US Navy

Colony-class frigates, Royal Navy

See also
 List of escorteurs of France

References

External links

 PF-1 Tacoma GlobalSecurity.org
 PG-111/PF-3 Tacoma NavSource Online
 USS Tacoma history.navy.mil

 

Frigate classes
 
 Tacoma
Cold War frigates and destroyer escorts of the United States
Ship classes of the United States Navy
Ship classes of the French Navy